The former French Catholic diocese of Couserans existed perhaps from the fifth century to the French Revolution in the late eighteenth century. It covered the former province of Couserans, in south-west France. Its episcopal seat was in Saint-Lizier, a small town to the west of Foix. It was a suffragan of the archdiocese of Auch.

History

Couserans was the fifth of the Novempopulaniae civitates.  In the 580's peace and a division of territories was arranged between the Merovingian kings Guntram (561–592) and Childebert II (575–595), in which the territory of Couserans was assigned to Childebert. According to Gregory of Tours, the first bishop was Valerius, before the sixth century. Bishop Glycerius was present at the Council of Agde in 506. According to Louis Duchesne, he should be identified with Lycerius whom the Gallia Christiana places later in the list of bishops.  Lycerius was patron saint of St-Lizier, the town in which the bishops of Couserans had their official residence.

The historian Pierre de Marca (1643–52), a native of Béarn and President of the Parliament of Navarre, was subsequently Bishop of Toulouse and Archbishop of Paris.

Up until the administration of Bishop Bernard de Marmiesse (1654–1680), the town of Saint-Lezier had two co-cathedrals, the Cathedral of Notre-Dame-de-la-Sède in the upper town next to the Episcopal Palace, and the Cathedral of St.-Lizier farther down to the south.  Each co-cathedral was served by its own Chapter, each Chapter having a Precentor, a Sacristan, an Operarius, six Canons, ten Prebendarii and a priest called the Vicar Perpetuus.  Over both Chapters stood the Archdeacon and the Aumonier. Bishop de Marmiesse united the two chapters and based them in the Cathedral of Notre-Dame-de-la-Sède; it was composed of the Archdeacon, two Precentors, two Sacristans, two Operarii, the Aumonier, twelve Canons, and two Vicarii perpetui;  there were twenty-four prebends. In 1752 there was one dignity and twelve Canons.

Bishops

to 1200

 c. 451:  Valerius
 506-c. 548: Glycerius
 549-551: Theodorus
 c. 614: Johannes I 
 Saint Quintianus
 † ca. 663: Saint Licerius
 c. 663 or 664: Sesemundus
 Maurolenus
 c. 788-c. 791: Francolinus
 c. 879: Wainardus
 c. 887: Rogerius or Roger I.
 973-978: Bernardus or Bernard I.
 c. 1019: Atto
 c. 1025: Berengarius or Béranger I.
 c. 1035: Bernard II. Raymond
 1068-1078: Pelet
 1078-1085: Vacant
 1085-1095: William I. or Guilielmus
 1117-1120: Jordanes I.
 1120-1155: Petrus or Pierre I.
 1165-1177: Rogerius or Roger II.
 c. 1177: Augustinus
 Stephanus (?)
 c. 1180: Auger I. (or Augerius I.)
 1190-1191: Arnoldus or Arnaldus I.
 1195-1198: Laurentius

1200 to 1400

 1208-1211: Navarrus d'Acqs
 1213: Sance or Sanchius
 c. 1226: Raymond I. (or Raymundus I.)
 c. 1229: Cerebrun
 1246–4 October 1270: Nikolaus
 c. 1273: Petrus or Pierre II.
 ?-16. October 1275: Raymond II. de Sobole or de Saboulies
 1277-c. 1279: Raymond III. de Rostoil
 1279–1 June 1303: Auger II. (or Augustin) de Montfaucon
 1303 - 31 May 1309: Bernard III. de Montaigu
 4 July 1309 - 31 May 1329: Arnaldus II. Fredeti
 27 June 1329 - 17 July 1336: Raymond IV. de Montaigu
 17 July 1336 - c. 1337: Antonius d'Aspel
 c. 1337-1342: Pierre III. de Palude
 Durandus
 1354–1 December 1358: Canardus
 c. 1358-1360 or 1361: Jean II. de Rochechouart
 c. 1361–17 October 1362: Béranger II.
 10 December 1362 - 1368: Ponce de Villemur
 19 August 1371 - 18 May 1384: Amelius de Lautrec
 [1381-1384: Arnaldus III.]
 18 May 1384 - 1389: Pierre IV Aymery (Avignon Obedience)
 27 May 1390 – 17 October 1390: Robert du Bosc
 17 October 1390 – 18 September 1405: Gérald or Gérard I de Brolio (de Breuil)

1400 to 1800

 1405 - 19 Juli 1412: Sicard (or Aicard) de Burguiroles
 23 September 1412 –  (17. January): Guillaume III. Beau-Maître
 1417-1423?: Guillaume IV. de Nalajo
 22 December 1423 – 18 May 1425: Arnaldus
 1425-1428: Jean III
 1428-1432: Gérard II. Faidit
 before 23 March 1439 - 1440: André
 18 April 1440 - 1443: Jordanes II. d'Aure
 1443-c. 1444: Raymond VI. de Tullio
 1444-1460: Tristan
 5 November 1460 - 10 March 1475: Guiscard d'Aubusson
 1480-1515: Jean IV. d'Aule
 25 June 1515 - 24 April 1523: Charles de Grammont
 28 April 1523 - 19 September 1524: Gabriel I. de Grammont
 1524-1548: Ménald de Martory
 1548-1574: Hector d'Ossun
 1581-1584: François Bonard
 1593-1612: Jérôme de Langue (de Lingua)
 1614–14. November 1621: Octave de Bellegarde
 7 June 1623 - October 1642: Bruno Ruade, O.Cart.
 1642-1654: Pierre de Marca
 28 May 1654 - 22 January 1680: Bernard IV. de Marmiesse
 1680 - 24 December 1707: Gabriel II. de Saint-Estève
 24 June 1708 - October 1725: Isaac-Jacob de Verthamont
 12 January 1727 - 1752: Jean-François de Machéco de Prémeaux
 22 October 1752 - 28 September 1779: Joseph de Saint-André-Marnays de Vercel
 1780 - 1795: Dominique de Lastic

See also
 Catholic Church in France
 List of Catholic dioceses in France

References

Bibliography

Reference works
 pp. 540–541. (Use with caution; obsolete)
  (in Latin) pp. 103–104.
 (in Latin) p. 134.
 p. 176.
 p. 160.
 p. 169.
 p. 179.

Studies

Former Roman Catholic dioceses in France
Dioceses established in the 5th century